Mardell is a surname. Notable people with the surname include:

 Alexandra Mardell (born 1993), English actress
 Alison Mardell (born 1968), British solicitor and senior RAF officer
 Mark Mardell (born 1957), British journalist
 Russell Mardell (born 1975), English writer and film director